Mughalsarai Junction, officially known as Pt. Deen Dayal Upadhyaya Junction, (station code: DDU, formerly MGS) is a railway station in the town of Mughalsarai in the Indian state of Uttar Pradesh. The station contains the largest railway marshaling yard in Asia. Mughalsarai yard cater to around 450–500 trains in a month. All trains including premium category east bound Rajdhani trains and Duronto trains halt (makes it unique in entire Indian Railway Network; which distinguishes it from other major railway stations like Prayagraj junction, Bhopal junction, Agra Cantt, Gwalior junction, Kharagpur, Nagpur etc.) at this station. Major installations in Mughalsarai include electric locomotive shed holding 147 locomotives, diesel locomotive shed holding 53 locomotives, wagon ROH shed and a 169-bed divisional hospital.

History 

The East Indian Railway Company started connecting Delhi and Howrah from the mid nineteenth century. This was the second biggest railway station after Gaddar, near Karachi (in Pakistan now) which was constructed during the British rule in 1862. Famously known as the gateway to east India, this junction was set up as part of a project to connect Delhi–Calcutta route by British railway company known as the East Indian Railways.

The station is located on the Grand Trunk Road route. It was one of the busiest corridors during Mughal era which connected east India with the north. In 1862, the railway tracks crossed Mughalsarai and reached the western bank of the Yamuna. The through link to Delhi was established in 1866. The Grand Chord was commissioned in 1906.

The Dufferin Bridge across the Ganges was opened in 1887, connecting Mughalsarai to Varanasi.

Name change 
Established on the Grand Trunk Road, the station boasts of an interesting past. Built by Sher Shah Suri, this road served as a main course for a majority of caravans, during the medieval era and much later as well, travelling from East or South India towards North India. Being as busy as it was, and still is, there were several sarais (inns) on both sides of the road, and hence the name — Mughalsarai.
On the evening of 10 February 1968, barely two months after he was elected president of the Bharatiya Jana Sangh, Deen Dayal Upadhyay boarded the Sealdah Express from Lucknow to Patna. A few hours later, his body was found near a pole a few hundred feet from the end of a platform at Mughalsarai station.

What followed was a long and involved investigation into what the Sangh insisted was a politically motivated murder. A CBI probe called it an accident; two men confessed to pushing him out of the train in a robbery attempt but were acquitted for lack of evidence; there was no sign of struggle or injury on Upadhyay's person. And conspiracy theories about internal power battles in the Sangh still abound. In 1992, then government of the state of Uttar Pradesh attempted to rename Mughalsarai after Deen Dayal Upadhyaya However, the plan was shelved when Kalyan Singh, the chief minister was forced to resign after an outbreak of violence in the state following the Babri Masjid demolition. In 2017, Government of India approved a fresh proposal forwarded by the Yogi Adityanath-led state government to rename the station. The station was officially renamed to Pandit Deen Dayal Upadhyaya junction on 4 June 2018.

Electrification 
The Gaya–Pt. Deen Dayal Upadhyaya Junction sector was electrified in 1961–63. Mughalsarai yard was electrified in 1963–65.

Marshalling yard 
Mughalsarai marshalling yard is the largest in Asia. It is 12.5 km long and handles around 1,500 wagons daily. Wagon handling has come down after the railways discontinued piecemeal loading. At its peak, it handled 5,000 wagons a day. Of all divisions on Indian Railways, Mughalsarai Division deals the most intense train operations – both Goods and Coaching. It is the bridge between Eastern part and Northern part of India. It closes the distance between pit head coal and power house, finished steel product to user, food grain and fertilizer to eastern part of the country and other raw material to industries. The operational efficiency of the Division plays a pivotal role in determining the efficiency of the East Central Railway and any setback or inefficiency in operations on this Division is a sensitive matter which affects the overall operations of the Railways. Because of its crucial importance, the Railway Board keeps a special watch on Mughalsarai division's operations.

Sheds and workshops 
Mughal Sarai diesel loco shed is home to WDM-2, WDM-3A and WDS-5 diesel locos. The diesel shed also holds 50 electric locos, all of them WAG-7. There was a Northern Railway diesel loco shed at Mughalsarai. It was decommissioned in 2001. Mughalsarai electric loco shed can hold more than 150 electric locos. Amongst them are WAP-4 and more than 70 WAG-7 locos. The electric shed has recently started holding WAG-9 locomotives.

The largest wagon repair workshop of Indian Railways is located at Mughalsarai.

Passenger movement 
Pt. Deen Dayal Upadhyaya Junction Junction is amongst the top hundred booking stations of Indian Railways.

Amenities 
Pt. Deen Dayal Upadhyaya Junction railway station has 2 AC rooms, 4 non-AC retiring rooms, and a ten-bedded non-AC dormitory. It has a food plaza and a ‘Jan Aahar’ (affordable food) facility. The station has ATMs of nationalised banks.

Gallery

See also
Varanasi Junction railway station
Varanasi City railway station
Kashi railway station
Banaras railway station
Kerakat railway station
Gaya Junction railway station
Dhanbad Junction railway station

References

External links 
 

Railway stations in Chandauli district
Mughalsarai railway division
Railway junction stations in Uttar Pradesh
Railway stations opened in 1862
Transport in Mughalsarai
Memorials to Deendayal Upadhyay
Indian Railway A1 Category Stations